Tonight is the fourth extended play of South Korean boy band Big Bang. It was their first new material released in South Korea after two-year hiatus as a group. Upon its release, the album and its lead single of the same name became a chart-topper in various South Korean and international music charts. It was released on February 24, 2011, under YG Entertainment. A repackaged edition titled Big Bang Special Edition was released on April 8, 2011, and featured a new track "Love Song" as the lead single.

Background 
While writing the songs for the then-untitled album, leader G-Dragon and lead rapper T.O.P began to break away to collaborate on their GD & T.O.P project. According to G-Dragon, the group was trying a "new combination" with their music, in which the vocalists Taeyang, Daesung, and Seungri were to record their own music as a trio while the remaining two were to branch off as a duo since they had not been with their fans for the past two years. Although the division of the group was initially for BigBang's materials only, G-Dragon and T.O.P saw positive response to their materials from the fans and went to Yang Hyunsuk, CEO of YG Entertainment, to allow the duo to release an album.

Composition
After the promotions for GD & T.OP. collaboration ended, the group reunited to record the tracks to be included for Tonight. Songs from the album have been reportedly recorded variously over the two years span that the group was on hiatus.  G-Dragon describes the music from the extended play as "very cheerful" in hopes of cheering up their listeners. Though the group's previous extended plays contained songs that were heavily influenced by electronic music, the group decided to concentrate more on "warm rock music."

Promotion and release 
After nearly two-year hiatus, BigBang made their comeback in South Korea in February 2011 which kicked off with their annual concert, Big Show 2011.  There, they also showcased songs from Tonight, performing before an audience of 40,000 fans.  The show was aired online by SBS and Mnet. The performance has been hailed as "sensual and stylish" as well as "luxurious" by Lee Soo-yeon of Newsen while it was called "fresh and bold" by Yonhap News, which also went on to state that "Big Bang has come back brilliantly." Park Young-gun of the Star News also applauded the group for their use of lavish props, calling the performance "compelling" and "explosive" and declaring that "Big Bang has come back stronger than ever." The show was watched by a nationwide audience of 5.7%, higher than the 4.9% expected. Revenues from the concert were reported to be ₩43 billion ($38 million).

Teaser photos of the group's music video for their lead single Tonight, which was written solely by G-Dragon with the rap parts written by T.O.P, were also released online. The group also acknowledged their return to the music industry by posting it as their status on Taeyang's Twitter account.

Reception

Critical reception 
The EP has received mostly positive praises, with Expo Flat News complimenting it for its "impressive, sophisticated sound textures." The lead single "Tonight" was also praised for its "sophisticated electronic sound" paired with acoustic guitar. Lee Jeon-hyuk of Sports Chosun hailed the group's comeback as "brilliant" while Choi Jun of Asiae complimented the group's new direction in their music, acknowledging that during the two years of hiatus, the group's "style and musical sensibility [had] deepened." Despite this, the group have been criticized for their over-use of electronic sound.

Commercial performance 
Tonight peaked at number one on the weekly Gaon Album Chart in addition to the monthly chart for February 2011. The album has sold 100,000 copies in South Korea. Internationally, it charted at number 3 on the Billboard World Albums chart, also number 3 on the Heatseekers chart, and number 29 on the Independent Albums chart. After the release of Big Bang Special Edition, it topped the weekly and monthly album charts in April 2011.

Track listing

Charts

Album

Tonight

BigBang Special Edition

Sales

Release history

References

BigBang (South Korean band) EPs
2011 EPs
YG Entertainment EPs
Korean-language EPs
Albums produced by G-Dragon